Lucilla Matthew Andrews Crichton (born 20 November 1919 in Suez, Egypt – d. 3 October 2006 in Edinburgh, Scotland) was a British writer of 33 romance novels from 1954 to 1996. As Lucilla Andrews she specialised in hospital romances, and under the pen names Diana Gordon and Joanna Marcus wrote mystery romances.

She was a founding member of the Romantic Novelists' Association, which honoured her shortly before her death with a lifetime achievement award.

Biography
Born Lucilla Matthew Andrews on 20 November 1919 in Suez, Egypt, the third of four children of William Henry Andrews and Lucilla Quero-Bejar. They met in Gibraltar, and married in 1913. Her mother was daughter of a Spanish doctor and descended from the Spanish nobility. Her British father worked for the Eastern Telegraph Company (later Cable and Wireless) on African and Mediterranean stations until 1932. At the age of three, she was sent to join her older sister at boarding school in Sussex.

She joined the British Red Cross in 1940 as a VAD, and later trained as a nurse at St Thomas' Hospital, London, during World War II. In 1947, she retired and married Dr James Crichton, but discovered that he was addicted to drugs. In 1949, soon after their daughter Veronica was born, he was committed to hospital and she returned to full-time nursing by night,  while writing by day. In 1952, she sold her first romance novel, published in 1954, the same year that her husband died. She specialised in doctor-nurse and hospital romances, using her personal experience as inspiration.

In 1969, she decided to move to Edinburgh. Her daughter read History at Newnham College, Cambridge, and became a journalist and Labour Party communications adviser, before her death from cancer in 2002.

She was a founder member of the Romantic Novelists' Association in 1960 and an inaugural recipient of their Lifetime Outstanding Achievement Award, in the Scottish Parliament shortly before her death.

Andrews died on 3 October 2006 in Edinburgh, Scotland, UK.

Plagiarism
In late 2006, Lucilla Andrews' autobiography No Time for Romance became the focus of a posthumous controversy. It has been alleged that the novelist Ian McEwan plagiarised from this work's description of Andrews' WWII nursing experiences while writing his novel, Atonement. McEwan has protested his innocence. The acknowledgements on the back page of Atonement had included Andrews' book as an inspiration and source. Andrews herself appeared to be untroubled by the connection between the books or the controversy.

Bibliography

Standalone novels 
The Print Petticoat (1954)
The Secret Armour (1955)
The Quiet Wards (1956)
The First Year (1957)
A Hospital Summer (1958)
The Wife of the Red-Haired Man (1959)
My Friend the Professor (1960)
Nurse Errant (1961)
Flowers from the Doctor (1963)
The Young Doctors Downstairs (1963)
The New Sister Theatre (1964)
The Light in the Ward (1965)
A House for Sister Mary (1966)
Hospital Circles (1967)
Highland Interlude (1968)
The Healing Time (1969)
Edinburgh Excursion (1970)
Ring O'Roses (1972)
Silent Song (1973)
In Storm and in Calm (1975)
Busman's Holiday (1978)
The Crystal Gull (1978)
After a Famous Victory (1984)
Lights of London (1985)
The Phoenix Syndrome (1987)
Frontline 1940 (1990)
The Africa Run (1993)

Endel & Lofthouse Trilogy 
A Few Days in Endel (1967) aka Endel House (originally as Diana Gordon)
Marsh Blood (1980) (originally as Joanna Marcus)
The Sinister Side (1996)

Jason Trilogy
One Night in London (1979)
Weekend in the Garden (1981)
In an Edinburgh Drawing Room (1983)

Serialised novels 
The Golden Hour (Woman and Home; 1955–6)
The Fair Wind (Woman's Weekly; 1957)
Pippa's Story (Woman's Weekly; 1968)

Omnibus 
My Friend the Professor / Highland Interlude / Ring O' Roses (1979)

References

External links 

Obituary in the Scotsman
Lucilla Andrews (publisher's website

1919 births
2006 deaths
Nurses from London
British romantic fiction writers
British women novelists
Women romantic fiction writers
20th-century British novelists
20th-century British women writers
British expatriates in Egypt